"21st Century Life" is the second single from Sam Sparro's eponymous debut album, released on 21 July 2008.

The Song was featured on one episode of Britannia High and it is also the theme music to the BBC Three drama, Personal Affairs.

The song made it to BBC Radio 1's C-List, but was later dropped.

It was performed on the first live result show on reality television series, So You Think You Can Dance Australia, on 16 February 2009

The song was one of 50 tracks selected for the official NBA 2K17 soundtrack, which was curated by Grimes, Imagine Dragons and Noah Shebib.

Music video
The video features Sparro dancing and singing in front of bright backgrounds intercut with animations of cardboard cut-out characters. The video was directed by Mariah Garnett.

Track listing
UK CD single
 "21st Century Life" (Radio Edit) – 3:31
 "American Boy" (Radio 1 Live Lounge) – 3:37
 "Black and Gold" (Radio 1 Live Lounge) – 4:19
 "No End in Sight" – 3:55
 "21st Century Life" (Denis the Menace & Big World Club Mix) – 7:07

21st Century Life + Remixes – Digital EP 1
21st Century Life (JW Mix Radio Edit) – 3:31
21st Century Life (Steve Mac Remix) – 8:27
21st Century Life (Denis The Menace & Big World Club Mix) – 7:08
21st Century Life (Count And Sinden Sidewinder Remix) – 4:55
21st Century Life (Eazy Remix) – 6:23

21st Century Life + B-Sides – Digital EP 2
21st Century Life – 4:21
No End in Sight – 3:55
American Boy (Radio 1 Live Lounge) – 3:37
21st Century Life (Mac Project Remix) – 8:27
21st Century Life (Kraak & Smaak Remix) – 7:09

Official versions and remixes
 Album Version
 JW Mix Radio Edit
 The Count & Sinden Sidewinder Remix
 Denis The Menace & Big World Club Mix
 Eazy Remix
 Kraak and Smaak Remix
 Mac Project Main Mix
 Mac Project Mix Acapella
 Mac Project Mix Instrumental
 Steve Mac Dub
 Steve Mac Remix

Personnel
Credits adapted from the liner notes of Sam Sparro.

Paul Epworth – production
 James Bowen Falson – guitar
 Sam Falson – vocals, writing, production
 Dan Grech-Marugerat – mixing
 Jesse Rogg – writing, production

Charts
On 27 July 2008, the song entered the UK Singles Chart at number 77 on downloads alone and peaked at number 44. Even though the single was released in 2008 the song did not chart in the Australian ARIA chart until February 2009.

References

2008 singles
Sam Sparro songs
2008 songs
Songs written by Sam Sparro
Island Records singles
Song recordings produced by Paul Epworth
Songs written by Jesse Rogg